MacSoft was an American video game developer and publisher founded in 1993 by Peter Tamte as subsidiary of WizardWorks, specializing in the production of video game ports from Microsoft Windows to Macintosh operating systems, as well as productivity software. In 1996, WizardWorks was acquired by GT Interactive (later renamed Infogrames, Inc.), with WizardWorks and MacSoft split into different operationals. On January 30, 2003, MacSoft was acquired by Destineer, and founder Peter Tamte again became the company's director.

Games published 
 Advanced Dungeons & Dragons: Collectors Edition
 Age of Empires
 Age of Empires II
 Age of Empires III
 Age of Empires III: The Asian Dynasties
 Age of Empires III: The WarChiefs
 Age of Mythology
 Beach Head 2000
 Civilization II
 Dark Vengeance
 Deadlock: Planetary Conquest
 Duke Nukem 3D
 Fallout
 Halo: Combat Evolved
 Lode Runner 2
 Mac Arcade Pak
 Mac Arcade Pak 2
 Master of Orion II
 Max Payne
 Myth III: The Wolf Age
 Neverwinter Nights
 Neverwinter Nights: Hordes of the Underdark
 Neverwinter Nights: Shadows of Undrentide
 Quake
 Railroad Tycoon
 Railroad Tycoon 3
 Rainbow Six
 Rise of Nations Gold Edition
 Terminal Velocity
 Tropico 2: Pirate Cove
 Unreal
 Unreal Tournament 2004
 Zoo Tycoon 2

References

External links 
 

 
Companies based in Plymouth, Minnesota
Macintosh software companies
Video game companies established in 1993
Video game companies disestablished in 2011
Defunct video game companies of the United States
Defunct companies based in Minnesota